The Orchestre Métropolitain (OM) is a symphony orchestra in Montréal, Québec, formed in 1981. It performs primarily in the Montreal Symphony House at Place des Arts but also at Salle Wilfrid-Pelletier and Théâtre Maisonneuve. Outside the city centre the OM plays in Saint-Laurent, Outremont, Hochelaga-Maisonneuve, Rivière-des-Prairies–Pointe-aux-Trembles, Saint-Léonard, Verdun, Ahuntsic, Pierrefonds-Roxboro and Pointe-Claire.

History
The roots of the orchestra date to 1980, when the ensemble Les Variations became the official orchestra for the Concerts Lachine series.  The ensemble consisted of young music graduates from Montreal conservatories.  In 1981, Les Variations changed its name to the Orchestre Métropolitain du Grand Montréal, with Robert Savoie as its first chairman (until 1985) and Hun Bang as its first executive director (until 1987).  The orchestra's first music director was Marc Bélanger, from 1981 to 1986.  Bélanger also served as artistic director from 1986 to 1987.  The orchestra gave occasional concerts for its first few years, and staged its first regular season of concerts in 1985.

The orchestra compressed its official name to the Orchestre Métropolitain in 1986.  Also in 1986, the Choeur de l'Orchestre Métropolitain was formed, with Jacques Faubert as its first director.  That same year, Agnès Grossmann became the OM's second music director, and its second artistic director the next year.  She held both posts through 1995.  During the 1980s and 1990s, the OM made a number of recordings for Radio-Canada and Analekta.  In 1993, the OM began its free summer concerts in Montreal parks and also performed in the Métro for the first time.

Joseph Rescigno became the OM's artistic director in 1995, and held the post through 2000.  Yannick Nézet-Séguin took up the post of artistic director in 2000.  Nézet-Séguin has conducted the OM in several commercial recordings for the ATMA Classique label, including symphonies of Anton Bruckner and Gustav Mahler.  In April 2013, the OM announced the appointment of Julian Kuerti as its first-ever principal guest conductor, with an initial contract of three years.  Following several contract extensions with Nézet-Séguin, in September 2019, the OM announced its contract with Nézet-Séguin as a lifetime contract.

In January 2005, the OM and Nézet-Séguin received three Opus awards from the Conseil québécois de la musique, two for their recording of Mahler's Symphony No. 4 and one for their concert performance of Alban Berg's Wozzeck.  In October 2005, the OM received a Felix Prize from the ADISQ awards for their album of Kurt Weill, in collaboration with Diane Dufresne.  In 2010, the OM won an Opus Award for their recording of Bruckner's Sympnony No. 9.

Music directors and artistic directors
 Marc Bélanger (1981-1986, Music Director; 1986-1987, Artistic Director)
 Agnès Grossmann (1986-1995, Music Director; 1988-1995, Artistic Director)
 Joseph Rescigno (1995-2000)
 Yannick Nézet-Séguin (2000–"for life")

See also
 List of symphony orchestras
 Canadian classical music

References

External links
 Official OM homepage
 Official OM history page
 Canadian Encyclopedia page on the Orchestre Métropolitain
 Atma record label page on the Orchestre Métropolitain

Canadian orchestras
Musical groups established in 1981
Musical groups from Montreal
1981 establishments in Quebec